Gerry Branch is a stream in Hickman County, Tennessee, in the United States.

Gerry Branch was named for a pioneer named Gerry, an original owner of land near the creek.

See also
List of rivers of Tennessee

References

Rivers of Hickman County, Tennessee
Rivers of Tennessee